The Sierra Nevada brushfinch (Arremon basilicus) is a species of bird in the family Passerellidae.

Taxonomy

The Sierra Nevada brushfinch was often treated as a subspecies of the stripe-headed brushfinch (A. torquatus), but was determined a distinct species on the basis of differences in vocalization, plumage, and genetics.  The SACC split the group in 2010.

References

 

Sierra Nevada brushfinch
Birds of the Sierra Nevada de Santa Marta
Endemic birds of Colombia
Sierra Nevada brushfinch
Sierra Nevada brushfinch